Ikhwan Ciptady Muhammad (born 22 March 1994), is an Indonesian professional footballer who plays as a centre-back for Liga 2 club Bekasi City.

Honours

Club
PSS Sleman
 Liga 2: 2018

References

External links
 Ikhwan Ciptady at Soccerway
 Ikhwan Ciptady at Liga Indonesia

1994 births
Living people
Indonesian footballers
Association football defenders
Persis Solo players
PSS Sleman players
Sportspeople from Jakarta